Alka Pande is an Indian academic, author and museum curator.

Background
Alka Pande was born in Kolkata in 1956. She went to Convent of Jesus and Mary School, New Delhi until the 8th and then completed her class 9th to 12th in St. Mary's Convent School, Kanpur, ICS (1972).

Pande did her double MA in History of Art from Bombay University in 1981 and Panjab University in 1983. In 1996, she was Awarded a Phd in Art History from the Panjab University. Pande's thesis was on the Study of Ardhanarisvara in Indian Art, with special reference to Indian Sculpture. In 1999, she further did her Post Doctoral Degree from Goldsmiths College, University of London, under the Aegis of the Charles Wallace Fellowship, through the British Council.

Career
Pande has been a reader at the Department of Fine Arts, Panjab University, Chandigarh from 1996 till 2000 and before that she was the Director of the Museum of Fine Arts, Panjab University, Chandigarh.

2000–present: She is currently working as Art Consultant at the India Habitat Centre, New Delhi. Pande is also the visiting faculty of DJ Academy of Design, Coimbatore, Tamil Nadu.

Curated Shows
In 2015 and 2016: 'Art in the Metro', an ongoing initiative by India Habitat Centre and Delhi Metro at Jor Bagh and Mandi House Metro Stations in New Delhi
In October 2014, Pande curated The Kama-Sutra : spirituality and erotism in Indian art at Pinacothèque de Paris.  This was alongside Marc Restellini, director of the Pinacothèque de Paris. The show was on till 10 January 2015.
In March 2014, Pande was the guest curator for the Sculpture Gallery at the City Palace, Udaipur.  The show ‘Diving Gesture -  The Magnificence of Mewar Spirituality’ was organised by the Maharana of Mewar Charitable Foundation (MMCF), Udaipur, in association with UNESCO, New Delhi.
In 2011, she co-curated the Delhi Photo Festival, a biennial photography festival  organized by India Habitat Centre (IHC) and Nazar Foundation in Delhi
Curator of "India Awakens. Under the Banyan Tree" from November 2010 –February 2011 Essl Museum, Klosterneuburg near Vienna, Austria. This was part of the emerging artists series by bringing in 34 selected artists.

Books
Voices and Images, Penguin Enterprise, November 2015. 
Mukhwas Indian Food Through the Ages, Imprint, 2013 
Shringara – the many faces of Indian beauty, Year of publishing: 2011 
Leela – An Erotic Play of Verse and Art, Published by HarperCollins 2009
Kama Sutra - The Quest for Love Published by Brijbasi Art Press 2008 
Ardhanarishvara the androgyne Published by Rupa & Co., 2005 
Masterpiece Of Indian Art Published by Lustre Press, Roli Books, 2004
A Celebration of Love Article : Myriad Moods of Love, by Alka Pande - Published by Roli Books, 2004
Indian Erotic Art - Published by Roli Books, 2002
Folk Music & Musical Instruments of Punjab Dr. Alka Pande  - Published by Mapin Publishing, Ahmedabad, 2002
Indian Erotica  Alka Pande & Lance Dane - Published by Roli Books, 2002
Kama Sutra Introduction by Dr. Alka Pande - Published by Roli Books, 1999

Awards
In 2006, Pande was Awarded the Chevalier dans l'Ordre des Arts et des Lettres - Knight of the Order of Arts and Letters, bequeathed by the French government. 
In 2009, Pande received the Australian Asia Council Special Award
In 2015, Pande was awarded the Chandigarh Lalit Kala Akademi honours - in recognition of the distinguished contribution to art - with Amrita Sher-Gil Samman
On 23 March 2015  Alka Pande was awarded L’Oréal Paris Femina Women Awards 2015 under Design and Arts

References

External links
Alka Pande
https://web.archive.org/web/20150927101745/http://www.thefuschiatree.com/309/fullview
http://www.amazon.co.uk/Chinese-Erotica-Pocket-Alka-Pande/dp/8174362096
Hindustan Times 
http://www.goodreads.com/author/show/623844.Alka_Pande
Launch of
http://indiatoday.intoday.in/story/book-review-of-alka-pande-ardhanarishvara-the-androgyne/1/195010.html
http://www.amazon.in/Kamasutra-The-Quest-For-Love/dp/B0072GQSN8
https://archive.today/20150118220854/http://www.harpercollins.co.in/Miniwebsite/BookDetail.asp?Book_Code=2270&TB_iframe=true&width=570&height=390 
http://www.tribuneindia.com/2011/20111211/spectrum/main1.htm
Cambridge University Press India

1956 births
Living people
Indian art curators
Writers from Kolkata
Panjab University alumni
Indian women curators